Purna Shah (1570–1605), or Purendra Shah was the king of the Gorkha Kingdom in the Indian subcontinent, present-day Nepal. He was the father of Chatra Shah.

References

Gurkhas
1605 deaths
1570 births
People from Gorkha District
16th-century Nepalese people
17th-century Nepalese people
Nepalese Hindus